Alappuzha State assembly constituency is one of the 140 state legislative assembly constituencies at the state Kerala in southern India. It is also one of the 7 state legislative assembly constituencies included in the Alappuzha Lok Sabha constituency. The current MLA is P. P Chitharenjan of CPI(M).

Local self governed segments
Alappuzha Niyamasabha constituency is composed of the following local self governed segments:

Members of Legislative Assembly 
The following list contains all members of Kerala legislative assembly who have represented the constituency:

Key

* Indicates Bypoll

Election results 
Percentage change (±%) denotes the change in the number of votes from the immediate previous election.

Niyamasabha Election 2021

There were 1,54,149 registered voters in the constituency for the 2021 Kerala Niyamasabha Election.

Niyamasabha Election 2016 
There were 1,41,243 registered voters in the constituency for the 2016 Kerala Niyamasabha Election.

Niyamasabha Election 2011 
There were 1,93,532 registered voters in the constituency for the 2011 election.

See also
 Alappuzha
 Alappuzha district
 List of constituencies of the Kerala Legislative Assembly
 2016 Kerala Legislative Assembly election

References 

Assembly constituencies of Kerala
State assembly constituencies in Alappuzha district